Myllita is a genus of bivalves belonging to the family Lasaeidae. The type species is Myllita deshayesi, which was described by d'Orbigny and Récluz in 1850 based on a specimen collected from Southern Australia.

Species

Species:

Myllita auriculata 
Myllita bartrumi 
Myllita benthicola 
Myllita calva 
Myllita deshayesii 
Myllita finlayi 
Myllita fragilis 
Myllita gemmata 
Myllita pinguis 
Myllita polita 
Myllita praecursor 
Myllita stowei 
Myllita tasmanica 
Myllita vivens

References

Lasaeidae
Bivalve genera